Pavón or Pavon can refer to:

Animals
Doxocopa pavon, a brush-footed butterfly commonly known as the pavon
Horned guan (Spanish, pavón)
Peacock bass (Cichla), also known as the pavon

Places
Pavón, Costa Rica, a town in Puntarenas Province, Costa Rica
Battle of Pavón (1861)
Pavón, Santa Fe, a town in Santa Fe, Argentina
Pavón Prison, a notorious prison at Fraijanes, Guatemala
Isla Pavón, an island in the Santa Cruz River in southern Argentina
Teatro Pavón, a theatre in Seville

People
Adri Pavón (born 1989), Spanish footballer
Andrés Pavón (born 1962), Honduran politician and Human Rights activist
Blanca Estela Pavón (1926–1949), Mexican actress
Carlos Pavón (born 1973), Honduran footballer
Camerina Pavón y Oviedo (1862–1893), Mexican poet, granddaughter of José Ignacio Pavón
Cecilia Pavón (born 1973), Argentine writer, poet, and translator
Cristian Pavón (born 1996), Argentine footballer
Cristopher Pavón (born 1993), Honduran weightlifter
Daniel Pavón (born 1972), Spanish Olympic diver
Enrique Pavón Pereyra (1921–2004), Argentine historian and biographer
Eulises Pavón (born 1993), Nicaraguan footballer 
Francisco Pavón (born 1980), Spanish football defender
Francisco Pavón (Honduran footballer) (born 1977), Honduran football midfielder
José Antonio Pavón Jiménez, Spanish botanist based in South America
José Ignacio Pavón (1791–1866), Mexican civil servant, and briefly, interim President of Mexico
José María Morelos y Pavon, a military leader who fought in the Mexican War of Independence
Juan Pavón (born 1962), Spanish computer scientist
Juan Manuel Pavón (born 1976), Spanish footballer and manager
Juana Pavón (1945–2019), Honduran poet and actress
Julia Pavón (born 1968), Spanish historian and Professor of Medieval History
Luz Pavon, Model and the founder of PAVON NYC, a clothing brand
Manuel Pavón (born 1984), Spanish footballer 
Manuel Francisco Pavón Aycinena (1798–1855), Guatemalan politician
Matthieu Pavon (born 1992), French golfer
Michel Pavon (born 1968), French footballer and coach, son of Pépito Pavon
Pablo Pavón Vinales (born 1945), Mexican trade union leader and politician
Pastora Pavón (189 –1969), better known as La Niña de los Peines, Spanish flamenco singer
Pépito Pavon (1941–2012), Spanish footballer
Rafael Pavón (born 1951), Argentine footballer.